The Turkey men's national under-19 volleyball team represents Turkey in international men's volleyball competitions and friendly matches under the age 19 and it is ruled by the Turkish Volleyball Federation body that is an affiliate of the Federation of International Volleyball FIVB and also part of the European Volleyball Confederation CEV.

Results

Summer Youth Olympics
 Champions   Runners up   Third place   Fourth place

FIVB U19 World Championship
 Champions   Runners up   Third place   Fourth place

Europe U19 / U18 Championship
 Champions   Runners up   Third place   Fourth place

Team

Current squad

The following is the Turkish roster in the 2015 FIVB Volleyball Boys' U19 World Championship.

Head Coach: Salih Erdogan Tavaci

See also
 Men's
Turkey Men's national volleyball team
Turkey Men's national volleyball team U23
Turkey Men's national volleyball team U21
Turkey Men's national volleyball team U19
 Women's
 Turkey Women's national volleyball team
Turkey Women's national volleyball team U23
Turkey Women's national volleyball team U20
Turkey Women's national volleyball team U18

References

External links
 Official website

National men's under-19 volleyball teams
U
Volleyball in Turkey